Platanias Football Club was a Greek professional football club based in Platanias, Chania, Greece. The club hosted its home games at the Perivolia Municipal Stadium. Platanias was the first, and to this day only club to have represented Chania in the Super League, playing for six seasons between 2012 and 2018. Their colors were red and white.

History

Formation and recent years
The association was founded in 1931 by Antonis Varouxakis.

In 1942–43, AO Platanias struggled in the final Cup against the traditional rivals Talos but having significant absences, such as Galanis, who brought a gun wound in the abdomen.

Although Platanias lost the match, the final had a special importance because of the shirts of the players. The jerseys were made from Nazi flags that had been stolen from the warehouses of the Germans, and residents had turned into the athletic apparel seamstresses in the village. From this fact it was introduced the red on the jerseys of the team. With the same jerseys, the team competed even against football teams of German soldiers.

In 1945, the team languished due to heavy immigration and the civil war that caused many players to leave their homeland.

In 1958, the club was reestablished by Manolis Mathioulakis and first president Emmanuel Kallitsakis playing at local third category.

Then Platanias became a member of the Union of Football Associations of Chania and from the first year climbed category, where it remained until 1969.

In 1970, they played for the first time in the first "local category".

In 1971 Platanias had another important game against the Renaissance Chania (today Ionia), but because of the political situation of the time, the team was punished and remained inactive until 1975.

After the restoration in 1975, Platanias was reestablished, struggling to C local class, where they remained for two years and then went to B', where they played another two years before to play in the A category.

From 1980 begins the rise of Platanias, who participated in the National Amateur Championships (equivalent to the existing C "National") contestant in Greece.

After their first two matches, the team demoted and then took a radical renewal, with footballers inhabitants of Platanias.

In 1985, they moved category (D "National"), but relegated the same year. For three years they fought in the First local championship Chania.

In 1989, they went to the Fourth National class for two periods.

In 1993, after relegation, struggled for a year in the Regional Championship and won. After relegation in 2002 they fought in the local league.

Between 2002 and the period from 2008 to 2009, they played in the Crete Regional Championship having a starring role collecting 305 points in total.

The best, by then, football year in the history of Platanias, was the 2008–09 and after a stunning season champion emerging regional championship.

The road to the top
In 2009–10 season, the team fought for first time entry to Gamma Ethniki and managed, after a long effort, to remain in this class. Specifically, Platanias won 38 points in all 34 games, finishing in 12th position in the league.

The next year 2010–11 Football League 2 Platanias had excellent performances and managed to finish in 5th place but gained promotion due to the Koriopolis scandal, when many teams were relegated from the Football League.

The period 2011–12 at the Football League started with the best conditions for Platanias, who managed to stand out from the beginning and even won the title of "champion of winter." The last day found Platanias in fifth in the standings with 60 points, while promotion play-offs of the 2011–12 Football League the team made excellent appearances against Kallithea, Kalloni and Panachaiki to take first place and ascend, to the 2012–13 Super League, for the first time in their history, but also more generally in the history of the Chania region football.

Six seasons in the Super League
In their first season in the Super League, Platanias finished in 9th place with 36 points. They beat historically powerful teams such as Panathinaikos with 2 wins home & away (totally 3 with a Greek Cup win), AEK with 1 home win & Aris with 2 wins home & away. Their biggest impact of this season, was eliminating Panathinaikos in the Fourth Round of the Greek Cup in a two-legged match.

The team's best performance was finishing 7th in the 2016-17 Super League season, however, the following year 2017-18 Platanias finished last and were then relegated to the second division.

Crest
Platanias' crest is a red trifolium, probably from a designer's mistake who instead of a platanus foil, he designed a simple trefoil. The name of the village "Platanias" means "area of Platanus".

Facilities

Platanias & Maleme Municipal Grounds

The municipal ground of Platanias, built in 1959 and still exists today, was built by the same residents who were using hoes to dig the field with donkeys carrying soil used to fill the field.
However, at that time were working on the basis of Marathi and an employee, resident of Platanias, Kostas Tsigounakis, volunteered to help build the stadium using a machine – loader base.
Today FC Platanias uses three pitches, two of which (grounds of Platanias and Maleme) belongs to Municipality of Platanias and one (Perivolia Municipal Stadium) in the Municipality of Chania.
The ground of Platanias, which located within the village, have plastic turf of modern standards since 2008–09 period.

The municipal ground of Maleme is land granted by the Greek Air Force in Platanias, who built the stadium with natural grass. Platanias played in this ground, until 2011–12 period. In these, indeed, installations, contains another ground, which like the ground of Platanias use for their workouts teams Academies FC Platanias.

Perivolia Municipal Stadium

From the season 2012–13 the team competes in Perivolia Municipal Stadium of Chania, which took place in record time, extensive upgrading and modernization work at all levels to meet in full all the obligations set by the organizing principle of Super League and NOVA TV.
The Municipal Ground of Perivolia has now "morphed" into a modern football stadium, with two tiers (one of them covered), journalists theories, comfortable – brand new changing rooms for athletes and referees (female assistants are separate changing rooms), dispensary, gym, comfortable office for the observer of the match, great room for press conferences and other venues.

Club sponsors

Honours

Domestic

Leagues
Delta Ethniki
Winners (1): 2008–09Cups
 Greek Cup:Quarter Finals (2): 2012–13, 2016–17

League performance

Pos. = Position; Pl = Match played; W = Win; D = Draw; L = Lost; GS = Goal scored; GA = Goal against; Pts = Points
Colors: Gold = winner; Green = promoted; Red = relegated.

Professional history
 6 seasons in the First Division 3 season in the Second Division 2 seasons in the Third Division 7 seasons in the Fourth Division'''

Statistics

Most appearances in professional divisions

Top-scoring players in professional divisions

Notable former players

Albania
 Arber Dhrami
 Emiljano Shehu
 Vasil Shkurti
 Enea Gaqollari
 Renato Ziko
 Franko Lamce 
 Kostika Tajari
 Adrian Imeri
 Oresti Batzio
Algeria
 Antar Yahia
Argentina
 Gastón González
 Juan Munafo
 Fabricio Poci
 Leonardo Ramos
Australia
 Apostolos Giannou
Austria
 Michael Gspurning
Belarus
 Mikalay Signevich
 Vitali Zhaludok
Bosnia and Herzegovina
 Haris Dilaver
 Ognjen Gnjatić
Brazil
 Cássio
 Gilvan Gomes
 Marcelo Labarthe
 Miguel Bianconi
 Tárik
 Vanderson Scardovelli
 Gott
 Matheus Leiria
Cameroon
 Banana Yaya
 Viera Ellong
Chad
 Azrack Mahamat
Croatia
 Igor Mirčeta
Cyprus
 Antonis Georgallides
Czech Republic
 Marios Pourzitidis
Congo
 Clévid Dikamona
DR Congo
 Bernand Itoua
 Markos Maragoudakis
 Bernand Itoua
 Clarck N'Sikulu
England
 Walter Figueira
Equatorial Guinea
 Lawrence Doe
France
 Pierrick Cros
 Mickaël Malsa
 David Oberhauser
 Kevin Olimpa
Germany
 Christos Karakitsos
 Giorgos Machlelis
 Stefanos Papoutsogiannopoulos
 Athanasios Tsourakis
 Panagiotis Vlachodimos

Ghana
 Samuel Inkoom
 Aziz Tetteh
Greece
 Ilias Anastasakos
 Vasilis Angelopoulos
 Alexandros Apostolopoulos
 Leonidas Argyropoulos
 Tasos Dentsas
 Alkis Dimitris
 Elini Dimoutsos
 Thanasis Dinas
 Giorgos Giakoumakis
 Fanouris Goundoulakis
 Antonis Iliadis
 Christos Intzidis
 Petros Kanakoudis
 Giannis Kargas
 Christos Karipidis
 Nikolaos Katsikokeris
 Konstantinos Kaznaferis
 Fotis Kipouros
 Evgenios Kitsas
 Nikos Korovesis
 Kostas Kourtesiotis
 Giorgos Lazaridis
 Giannis Liourdis
 Giorgos Manousos
 Stelios Marangos
 Kostas Mendrinos
 Thomas Nazlidis
 Konstantinos Pangalos
 Manolis Patralis
 Kostas Peristeridis
 Antonis Petropoulos
 Vasileios Pliatsikas
 Ioannis Potouridis
 Dimitris Raptakis
 Dimitris Sialmas
 Manolis Siopis
 Dimitris Stamou
 Giannis Stathis
 Lazaros Theodorelis
 Giorgos Valerianos
 Giannis Zaradoukas
India
 Gurjinder Singh
Liberia
 Herron Berrian
Lithuania
 Darius Zutautas
Malawi
 Tawonga Chimodzi
Mali
 Ousmane Coulibaly
Montenegro
 Filip Kasalica

Netherlands
 Doriano Kortstam
 Yaël Eisden
Nigeria
 Chidi Onyemah
 Chigozie Udoji
Palestine
 Saado Abdel Salam Fouflia

Poland
 Piotr Grzelczak
Portugal
 Emídio Rafael
 Vasco Faísca
 Vasco Fernandes
Serbia
 Nikola Beljić
 Željko Kalajdžić
 Aleksandar Katai
 Filip Kljajić
 Milivoje Lazic
 Luka Milunović
 Dimitris Popovic
 Filip Stanisavljević
 Miloš Stojčev
Spain
 Juan Aguilera
 Igor Angulo
 Cristian Castells
 David Cerra
 Didac Devesa
 Jaime Gavilan
 Raúl Llorente
 Toni Moral
 Mario Martínez (footballer, born 1985)
 Nili
 David Torres
Switzerland
 Fabian Stoller
Syria
 Abdul Rahman Oues
Turkey 
 Kendal Ucar
Ukraine
 Yevhen Budnik
 Evgeniy Kononenko
 Yevhen Neplyakh
 Vitaliy Pryndeta
 Yevhen Selin
 Vadym Shevchuk
Venezuela
 Ruben Arocha
 Andrés Sampredo

Managerial history

 Christos Vasileiou (2009 – 25 Oct 2009)
 Miodrag Ćirković (30 Oct 2009 – Sept 29, 2010)
 Timos Kavakas (Sept 29, 2010 – 6 July 2011)
 Andreas Pantziaras (6 July 2011 – 19 Oct 2011)
 Timos Kavakas (24 Oct 2011 – 20 March 2012)
 Giannis Chatzinikolaou (29 March 2012 – 19 Nov 2012)
 Angelos Anastasiadis (20 Nov 2012 – 23 May 2013)
 Marinos Ouzounidis (28 May 2013 – 4 Nov 2013)
 Nikos Anastopoulos (6 Nov 2013 – 8 Feb 2014)
 Angelos Anastasiadis (9 Feb 2014 – 18 May 2014)
 Giannis Christopoulos (23 May 2014 – 11 March 2015)
 Giannis Thomaidis (11 March 2015 – 16 March 2015)
 Georgios Paraschos (16 March 2015 – 31 October 2017)
  José Manuel Roca (12 Nov 2017 – 29 Jan 2018)
 Giannis Chatzinikolaou (31 Jan 2018 – 30 Jun 2018)
  Paulo Campos (18 July 2018 – 8 Oct 2018)

References

External links

 Official website 
 Platanias at UEFA

 
Defunct football clubs in Greece
Football clubs in Chania
Football clubs in Crete
1931 establishments in Greece